Mahmoud Torabinejad is an Iranian, a Professor of endodontics, and the Director of the Advanced Specialty Education Program in Endodontics at Loma Linda University School of Dentistry.

Early life and education
Torabinejad was born in Kashan, Iran. He graduated from Tehran Dental School in 1971, and trained in endodontics at the University of Illinois.

Career
Torabinejad practices clinically and is a researcher at Loma Linda University. In addition, he is involved with the Mahmoud Torabinejad Clinical Research Center in Isfahan, Iran.

He developed mineral trioxide aggregate, a material used in the repair of root perforations, and in creating an artificial barrier where a normal root canal filling is not possible, treating internal root resorption, and pulp capping.

Torabinejad is the author of many highly cited papers in the field of endodontics. In a 2011 review of the most cited papers in endodontics, Dr. Torabinejad was the author of 12 of the top 100 papers.

Torabinejad has also written a number of books with co-author Richard E. Walton.

References

External links
Google Scholar database

Year of birth missing (living people)
Living people
Iranian dentists
Loma Linda University faculty